Dulcolax may refer to:
 Dulcolax, a trade name of bisacodyl, a stimulant laxative drug that increases bowel movement
 Dulcolax Balance, a trade name of macrogol, an osmotic laxative
 Dulcolax Stool Softener, a trade name of dioctyl sodium sulfosuccinate, a common ingredient in products such as laxatives
Dulcolax SP Drops, a trade name of sodium picosulfate, a stimulant laxative drug.

Laxatives